The National Transport and Toy Museum in Wānaka, New Zealand is one of the largest private collections in the Southern Hemisphere and displays a large collection of items including over 650 vehicles, 20 aircraft and 60,000 toys plus thousands of miscellaneous items.

The main building houses part of the toy collection, notably a very large collection of Star Wars toys and memorabilia, a display of Barbie dolls through the decades, classic wooden and metal toys, as well as teddy bears and porcelain dolls.  A toy shop at the entrance also sells a range of modern toys and models.

The collections of vehicles and aircraft are on display in several large hangars.  The hangars include a range of vehicles including cars, aircraft, airport ground support, construction vehicles, farm implements, farm tractors, fire engines, military vehicles, motorbikes, scooters and mopeds, pickups, trucks, horse-drawn vehicles, marine vehicles, and a range of additional miscellaneous vehicles.

Outside of the buildings, the displays continue with machinery in various states of restoration, such as a long row of tractors and farming machinery.

The museum has indoor and outdoor playing areas with adult-sized pedal cars, a play area and a range anti-aircraft guns that can be sat and moved by visitors.

History
The collector, Gerald Rhodes, began collecting in Christchurch in the 1950s. Wanaka was chosen as the sight for the museum due to its dry climate, proximity to the Wanaka Airport, and location on the main road (State Highway 6). Building commenced on the museum in 1994 and the museum opened to the public on Boxing Day.

It was originally called the Wanaka Transport and Toy Museum before re-branding in 2010 to the current name of the National Transport and Toy Museum.

References

External links
 The National Transport and Toy Museum official site

Transport museums in New Zealand
Museums in Otago
Wānaka